Andrei Dîrzu is a former Romanian tennis player who won five medals at the Summer Universiades between 1979 and 1985.

References

Romanian male tennis players
Universiade medalists in tennis
Living people
Year of birth missing (living people)
Place of birth missing (living people)
Universiade gold medalists for Romania
Universiade bronze medalists for Romania
Medalists at the 1979 Summer Universiade
Medalists at the 1981 Summer Universiade
Medalists at the 1985 Summer Universiade
20th-century Romanian people